The cost-loss model, also called the cost/loss model or the cost-loss decision model, is a model used to understand how the predicted probability of adverse events affects the decision of whether to take a costly precautionary measure to protect oneself against losses from that event. The threshold probability above which it makes sense to take the precautionary measure equals the ratio of the cost of the preventative measure to the loss averted, and this threshold is termed the cost/loss ratio or cost-loss ratio. The model is typically used in the context of using prediction about weather conditions to decide whether to take a precautionary measure or not.

Mathematical model

Suppose we are concerned about the occurrence of an adverse event (such as rainfall during an outdoor picnic). Suppose that, if we do not take any action to address the possibility, and the adverse event does occur, we incur a loss L. On the other hand, if we undertake the specified precautionary action (which may mean taking umbrellas or tents to the picnic, or changing the picnic venue to a worse but rain-free location), then, regardless of whether or not the adverse event occurs, we incur a cost C. In other words, our matrix of costs is as follows:

Suppose the probability of the adverse event occurring is p. Then, the expected cost of taking the precautionary action is C and the expected cost of not taking the precautionary action is pL. Therefore, the precautionary action passes a cost-benefit analysis if  (or equivalently) and fails such an analysis if  (or equivalently). The case  is the case of indifference between taking and not taking the precautionary action.

This ratio is termed the cost-loss ratio.

Note that in the case that , it never makes sense to take the precautionary action, because even if we were certain of the event occurring, the cost of the precautionary action would still be greater than the loss experienced.

Note that, due to risk aversion, the values of cost and loss measured above need not be the same as the monetary values even in the case that they depend only on monetary values.

Application to the utility of forecasting

One of the goals of weather forecasting is to help obtain better probability estimates for the occurrence of adverse events, so that the decisions made in the cost loss model are more informed and have higher quality. Examples include predicting whether or not it will rain, whether or not it will snow, and whether there will be a hurricane, cyclone, blizzard, tornado, heavy winds or extreme temperatures. The ability of decision makers to translate probabilistic information provided by forecasts into good decisions is therefore a measure of the utility of weather forecasting.

The cost-loss model has also been applied in the context of decisions based on forecasts of air pollution levels and long-range weather forecasting, including ensemble forecasting.

See also

 Risk aversion
 Loss aversion
 Loss ratio
 Impairment cost

References

Risk management